Hell of a Tester (sometimes written Hellofatester) is the third studio album by The Rasmus, then called Rasmus. It was released in 1998 by Warner Music and received Gold status in Finland. The most popular single was Liquid, which was released in September, getting into the Top 40 on MTV Nordic. It was voted Single of the Year for 1998 by music critics and fans and the video won an award in 1999 at the Finnish Music Video Awards.

The booklet and cover art has braille dotting of lyrics from the songs inside and "Hellofatester" on the cover.

Track listing
All songs are written by The Rasmus.

 "Every Day" – 3:17
 "Dirty Moose" – 3:27
 "Swimming with the Kids" – 3:30
 "Man in the Street" – 3:32
 "Tonight Tonight" – 1:54
 "City of the Dead" – 3:23
 "Liquid" – 4:18
 "Pa-Pa" – 2:18
 "Vibe" – 2:48
 "Help Me Sing" – 3:26
 "Tempo" – 4:49

Singles
 The first single from the album was Liquid, released the same year as the album.
 The second single, Swimming with the Kids was released in 1999. It was the last single they released under the name "Rasmus", when they changed their name to "The Rasmus".

Credits
The Rasmus
 Lauri Ylönen: vocals
 Pauli Rantasalmi: Guitar
 Eero Heinonen: Bass
 Janne Heiskanen: drums

Additional musicians
 Saxophone by Aleksi Ahoniemi
 Trumpet by Jukka Tiirikainen
 Trombone by Matti Lappalainen
 Saxophone on Dirty Moose, Man in the Street and Vibe by Timo Lavanko and Ilkka Hämäläinen
 Saxophone on Tempo by Ilkka Hämäläinen
 Cellos on Every Day by Tuukka Helminen
 Timpani on Every Day by Mikko Pietinen
 Organ on Dirty Moose and Help Me Sing by Pate Kivinen
 Panda 49 on Swimming with the Kids and keyboards on Man in the Street and Tempo by Henri Sorvali
 Strings for Liquid arranged and conducted by Riku Niemi
 Kazoo sound effects on Swimming with the Kids by Luke Wadey

Additional personnel
 Produced at H.I.P. Studio and mixed at Finnvox Studios by Ilkka Herkman and produced by The Rasmus and Teja Kotilainen
 Liquid recorded and mixed by Juha Heininen at Millbrook Studio and produced by Rasmus and The Nose.
 Vibe recorded and mixed by Herkman at Finnvox and produced by Robert Palomäki
 Mastered by Pauli Saastamoinen at Finnvox

The Rasmus albums
1998 albums